Sir Nevile Montagu Butler  (1893–1973) was a British diplomat.

Butler was born in 1893 to Henry Montagu Butler and Agnata Frances Ramsay. He was educated at Harrow School and Trinity College, Cambridge. In 1923 he married Oonah Rose McNeile. After serving as Minister at the British Embassy at Washington in 1940–1941 he headed the North American Department of the Foreign and Commonwealth Office (1941–1944), and between 1944 and 1947 was assistant under-secretary there. He was then appointed as the British Ambassador to Brazil (1947–51) and to the Netherlands (1952–54). For his services he received the Order of St Michael and St George and Royal Victorian Order.

References

1893 births
1973 deaths
People educated at Harrow School
Alumni of Trinity College, Cambridge
British ambassadors to the Netherlands
Nevile